ANU –  Museum of the Jewish People, formerly the Nahum Goldmann Museum of the Jewish Diaspora, is located in Tel Aviv, Israel, at the center of the Tel Aviv University campus in Ramat Aviv.

ANU - Museum of the Jewish People is an institution telling the ongoing story of the Jewish people. Re-opened to the public on March 10, 2021, the organization is dedicated to celebrating and exploring the experiences, accomplishments, and spirit of the Jewish community from biblical times to the present.
Through its educational programming, the institution works to connect Jewish people to their roots and strengthen their personal and collective Jewish identity. The museum presents a pluralistic narrative of Jewish culture, faith, purpose, and deed as seen through the lens of Jewish history and current experience today.

The $100 million expanded museum, which replaces Beit Hatfutsot – The Museum of the Jewish People ("The Diaspora House" or "Beit Hatfutsot"), was designed and built over the past 10 years. It was funded by both the State of Israel, the Nadav Foundation, and private philanthropy.  As a first step in the renewal process, the museum added a new wing in 2016 with rotating temporary exhibitions, the Alfred H. Moses and Family Synagogue Hall featuring synagogue scale models, and Heroes - Trailblazers of the Jewish People, a children's interactive exhibition. 
 
The museum's new name and "its new brand identity adds “ANU” — Hebrew for “we”— to embrace inclusion and reflect the diversity and collective spirit of the Jewish people everywhere" said Museum Board Chair Irina Nevzlin. “It is a privilege to realize the transformation of this institution, which now becomes the largest and most comprehensive Jewish museum in the world. The museum will serve as a beacon of Jewish identity and culture, celebrating our unique history and future.”

History 
In 1959, the World Jewish Congress decided to build a museum that would serve both as an educational and cultural center for world Jewry. The institute in Israel was named in honor of Dr. Nahum Goldmann, the founder and president of the World Jewish Congress.

Abba Kovner, one of the founders of the museum, proposed the original concept of the museum's permanent core exhibition. It was based on a thematic principle, representing Jewish history and continuity, according to six themes, or "gates" that portray central aspects of Jewish life: family, community, faith, culture, existence and return. Among the founders of the museum, Jeshajahu Weinberg served as the museum's first director from 1978 to 1984 and Dr. Meyer Weisgal was its first President.

ANU - Museum of the Jewish People opened on May 15, 1978. Since then, it has been considered one of the most technologically advanced museums of our time. Its exhibitions were based on reconstructions and sets, using modern audiovisual and state-of-the-art computer technology to explore topics and themes throughout the museum. This methodology provided that a museum could be an effective storyteller. Its designers broke with the universally accepted tradition that museums exist first in order to acquire, care for and display objects from the past.

Government budget cuts and a decline in Israeli tourism triggered a budget crisis at the museum. A number of public representatives devoted themselves to saving the museum, among them Shlomo Lahat, former mayor of Tel Aviv, and Ariel Sharon, former prime minister. In 2005, the Israeli Knesset passed the "Beit Hatfutsot Law" that defines Beit Hatfutsot as "the National Center for Jewish Communities in Israel and around the world". A recovery plan was enacted with two partners: the Israeli Government and donor Leonid Nevzlin (NADAV Foundation), with a grant from the Claims Conference.

Exhibitions, programs, education, and research 

ANU - Museum of the Jewish People allows visitors to learn more about the Jewish experience through a number of access points. Onsite, the museum offers four wings of exhibitions, including 3 floors of new exhibition galleries (opened March 10, 2021), a children's gallery, and a rotating schedule of temporary exhibitions and related programs as well as conferences and workshops. The museum's databases house searchable archives of photos, films, music, genealogy, and family names, all related to the Jews and their history. Compiled over almost four decades, these databases are now fully digitized and available both onsite and online. The museum also offers formal and informal educational activities for teachers and students both at the museum and for use in classrooms around the world.

Governance 

Irina Nevzlin serves as the current Chair of the Board of Directors and is the President of the NADAV Foundation. Senator Joseph I. Lieberman (Honorary Chair), Ambassador Alfred H. Moses (Co-Chair) and Major-General (Ret.) Eitan Ben Eliyahu (Co-Chair) serve on the Board of Governors.

See also
Tourism in Israel

References

External links
 
 
 "Tracing History in Israel". The New York Times
 

Museums established in 1978
Jewish museums
Tel Aviv University
University museums in Israel
Museums in Tel Aviv
History museums in Israel
1978 establishments in Israel
Genealogical societies